Ben Sherwood (born 1964) is a media executive.

Benjamin or Ben Sherwood may also refer to:
Ben Sherwood (Holby City), a character from Holby City
Ben Sherwood, a character in Hard Guy
Benjamin Sherwood, a character in Wizards vs Aliens